Elizabeth Ross may refer to:
 Betty Ross (active since 1962), fictional character in Marvel Comics
 Liz Ross (active since 1972), Australian socialist activist and author
 Elizabeth Ness MacBean Ross (1878–1915), Scots-born physician to the Bakhtiari people
 Beth Ross (born 1996), New Zealand world champion rower

See also
Betsy Ross (disambiguation)